During 2005, tropical cyclones formed within seven different tropical cyclone basins, located within various parts of the Atlantic, Pacific and Indian Oceans. During the year, a total of 141 systems formed with 94 of these developing further and were named by the responsible warning centre. The most active basin in the year was the North Atlantic, which documented 28 named systems. The Western Pacific had an near-average season with 23 named storms. The Eastern Pacific hurricane season experienced an above-average number of tropical storm intensity systems, numbering 15. Throughout the year, 28 Category 3 tropical cyclones formed, including eight Category 5 tropical cyclones in the year.

The deadliest tropical cyclone of the year was Hurricane Stan in the North Atlantic Ocean, which killed more than 1,600 people in Central America, while the costliest tropical cyclone was Hurricane Katrina – also in the North Atlantic Ocean – which caused more than $125 billion in damage after striking United States especially New Orleans and its surrounding areas, making it the costliest tropical cyclone on record, tying with Hurricane Harvey in 2017.

Global atmospheric and hydrological conditions

A strong La Niña existed throughout 2005.

Summary

North Atlantic Ocean 

The activity was the most active Atlantic hurricane season in recorded history at the time, shattering numerous records, with 31 tropical or subtropical cyclones recorded. The United States National Hurricane Center named 27 storms, exhausting the annual pre-designated list and resulting in the usage of six Greek letter names. A record 15 storms attained hurricane status, with maximum sustained winds of at least 74 mph (119 km/h); of those, a record seven became major hurricanes, which are a Category 3 or higher on the Saffir–Simpson scale. The season's impact was widespread and catastrophic. Its storms caused an estimated 3,468 deaths and approximately $171.7 billion in damage. It was the costliest season on record at the time, until its record was surpassed 12 years later. It also produced the second-highest accumulated cyclone energy (ACE) in the Atlantic basin, surpassed only by the 1933 season. The season officially began on June 1, 2005, and the first storm – Arlene – developed on June 8. Hurricane Dennis in July inflicted heavy damage to Cuba. Hurricane Stan in October was part of a broader weather system that killed 1,668 people and caused $3.96 billion in damage to eastern Mexico and Central America, with Guatemala hit the hardest. The final storm – Zeta – formed in late December and lasted until January 6, 2006.

Eastern Pacific Ocean 

The activity continued the trend of generally below-average activity that began a decade prior. The season's first tropical cyclone, Adrian, developed on May 17 and reached its peak as a Category 1 hurricane. Named storms are infrequent in May, with one tropical storm every two years and a hurricane once every four years. At the time, Adrian was the fourth earliest tropical cyclone to form in the eastern Pacific since reliable record-keeping began in 1971. Activity throughout the remainder of the season was far less notable, with 16 tropical cyclones, 15 named storms, 7 hurricanes, and 2 major hurricanes. The long-term 1971–2004 average suggests an average season to feature 15 named storms, 9 hurricanes, and 4 major hurricanes. October, in particular, was notably quiet, with the formation of only one tropical depression; only three other seasons, 1989, 1995, and 1996, ended the month without the designation of a named storm.

Western Pacific Ocean 

Although the season was quiet, some typhoons caused extensive damages in many places, especially in China where eight typhoons struck the country. First, Typhoon Haitang became the strongest storm in the basin this year and caused about $1.1 billion in damages in Taiwan and China in mid July. In August, Typhoon Matsa made landfall in Eastern China and caused about $2.23 billion in damages. Later that same month, two powerful typhoons made landfall, causing extreme damage and some casualties. Similar to Haitang, Typhoon Longwang made landfall in Taiwan and China at a strong intensity causing damages. The season also marked the first time the Atlantic hurricane season was more active than the Pacific typhoon season (the others being 2010 and 2020). However, the 2005 Atlantic hurricane season featured record high activity while the Pacific typhoon season featured near average activity.

North Indian Ocean 

There were a total of 12 depressions during the year, three less than normal, although the highest since 1992. The IMD named four cyclonic storms, a process they initiated in 2004, which was also below normal. No systems strengthened beyond cyclonic storm status. The season was the sixth in a row with below normal activity, based on the seasonal accumulated cyclone energy. Storms generally develop when the monsoon trough is located over tropical waters, with a peak from May to June and another peak in November. The monsoon developed 11 distinct low-pressure areas by the end of September, including five monsoon depressions, and the monsoon season was more active than usual.

Systems

January

January was above average featuring thirteen tropical cyclones, of which ten of them being named. The month started off with a tropical low which was short lived in the Mozambique Channel. The month's first named storm Cyclone Sally formed on the 7th in the Australian basin, however it dissipated two days later. The South-West Indian Ocean basin also had two notable storms Cyclone Ernest and Tropical Storm Felapi which both impacted Madagascar. The North Indian Ocean had an early start with a depression and Cyclone Hibaru forming. The Northwest Pacific basin also had an early start with Tropical Storm Kulap forming near the Caroline Islands.

February

February was slightly below-average featuring nine tropical cyclones, of which seven were named. The Australian region featured Cyclone Harvey and Tropical Low Vivienne. Harvery formed in the Gulf of Carpentaria before making landfall on Queensland and the Northern Territory while Vivienne caused minor oil and gas distruptions in the Timor Sea. The Southern Pacific basin featuted seven cyclones of which three of them became Category 5 cyclones. Cyclones Meena, Olaf, Nancy, and Percy all affected the Cook Islands with Percy becoming the strongest storm of the month.

March

March was very inactive, featuring five tropical cyclones with all of them being named. The month started off with Cyclone Ingrid, which formed north of the Gulf of Carpentaria. Ingril was a erratic cyclone which effected much of Northern Australia as a Category 4 tropical storm. The storm made landfall on the town of Nhulunbuy as a Category 5 on the Australian scale. It then made a slow approach on Kimberley before dissipating. While, Ingril was a Category 5 cyclone, another storm named Cyclone Willy formed northwest of Australia. Willy only caused minor oil distruption in the Timor Sea but had no effect on land. The Western Pacific basin featured its second storm Tropical Storm Roke. Roke struck the Philippines as a mimimal typhoon killing 7 people. The South-West Indian Ocean featured two storms named Hennie and Isang. Hennie caused minor damage on Mauritius, and Réunion before accelerating towards the southeastern Indian Ocean. Isang on the other hand took a similar route with Hennie but had no effect on land.

April

April was average featuring eight tropical cyclones, of which three were named. The month started off with Cyclone Adeline-Juliet which became the strongest storm of the month. The storm was first noted near the Cocos Islands and was upgraded into Tropical Storm Adeline. It then entered the South-West Indian Ocean basin where the storm was renamed Juliet. It then intensified into an Intense Tropical Cyclone until the system weakened and became extratropical. Later 11U formed over the Arafura Sea and made landfall on Papua New Guinea. 11U was the last storm of the 2004–05 Australian region cyclone season. The second named storm was Cyclone Sheila which formed over Fiji. The storm then curved away from Fiji where the storm dissipated shortly after being named. The third named storm was Typhoon Sonca which formed in the Western Pacific. It then intensified into a Category 4 typhoon. Despite its strength, the typhoon stayed at sea and dissipated. The other unnamed storms were rather weak and short-lived as not much information is known.

May

May was a very inactive season featuring only three tropical cyclones with two of them being. The month's first storm started in the Western Pacific with the formation of a tropical depression named Crising which was named by the PAGASA. Crising formed east of the Philippine island of Mindanao however, the storm never organized into a tropical storm and did not receive an International name. It then dissipated east of the Philippines. The Eastern Pacific featured its first storm of the year, Hurricane Adrian. Adrian formed very early shortly after the season started and took an unusually northeast route towards El Salvador making it the closest hurricane ever to approach the country. It then made landfall on Honduras before dissipating. The last storm of the month was Nesat which formed near Guam. Nesat then intensified into a Category 4 typhoon before passing south of Japan before becoming extratropical southeast of Japan.

June

June was an inactive month featuring only six tropical storms with four of them being named. The Eastern Pacific featured Tropical Storm Arlene and Tropical Storm Calvin which formed south of Mexico. However, the two storms weren't much of a threat to the country. The Atlantic featured Tropical Storm Arlene and Tropical Storm Bret. Arlene, which became the first storm of the 2005 Atlantic hurricane season and the strongest storm of the month, formed very early north of Honduras. It traveled north in the Gulf of Mexico then made landfall near the Alabama-Florida border. Bret was a short lived storm that made landfall Veracruz in Mexico causing minor damage. The North Indian Ocean featured two depressions with one depression forming over India causing minor flooding.

July

July was average featuring fourteen tropical cyclones, with twelve of them being named. The East Pacific featured two tropical storms named Dora and Eugene. The two storms made a close approach to the Mexican coastline however, the damage was minimal. The Western Pacific saw the formation of Typhoons Haitang, Matsa and Tropical Storms Nalgae, Banyan, and Washi and Emong. Typhoon Haitang, which became the strongest storm of the month made landfall on China along with Typhoon Matsa which made landfall near Shanghai. Washi made landfall in Vietnam while Banyan made a close approach to Japan but missed the country and became extratropical east of Japan. The Atlantic featured three hurricanes and two tropical storms. Some notable storms include Dennis and Hurricane Emily. Dennis was an early-forming Category 4 hurricane that traveled across the Caribbean and eventually striking Alabama inflicting severe damage and killing at least 70 people. Dennis was then followed by Emily which also formed near Windward Islands. It then became the earliest-forming hurricane with a Category 5 strength. It was also the costliest Category 5 hurricane to not have its name retired. The North Indian Ocean featured the only non-named storm of the month classified as BOB 02 which was short lived.

August

August was average, featuring eighteen tropical cyclones with fourteen of them being named. The Eastern Pacific featured Hurricanes Fernanda, and Hilary, Tropical Storms Greg, and Irwin along with one depression classified as One-C. The five storms all stayed away from any landmass however, One-C's remnants dropped moderate rain on Hawaii causing minor damage. The Western Pacific featured three typhoons named Mawar, Talim, and Nabi and Severe Tropical Storms Sanvu and Ghuchol. Sanvu and Talim struck China while Mawar and Nabi affected Japan. The Atlantic featured Tropical Storms Harvey, Jose, and Lee and Hurricanes Irene and Katrina. Jose was short lived but struck Central Mexico causing minor damage. Hurricane Katrina on the other hand struck Florida and intensified into the season's second Category 5 hurricane. Katrina then struck New Orleans causing a large storm surge leaving the city completely flooded. The hurricane killed at least 1,800 people and inflicted $125 billion dollars worth of damage making it at the time the costliest tropical storm on record until it tied with Hurricane Harvey in 2017.

September

September was very active featuring 22 tropical storms with 17 of them being named. The Eastern Pacific featured Hurricanes Jova, Kenneth, Max, and Otis and Tropical storms Lidia and Norma. Otis became a Category 2 hurricane and threatened the Baja California Peninsula, however, it dissipated before it could reach the peninsula. The other storms on the other hand stayed at sea. The Western Pacific featured some deadly storms mostly being Typhoons Khanun, Damrey, Vicente, and Longwang. Khanun, Damrey, and Longwang all struck China killing more than 350 people. Vincente on the other hand looped in The South China Sea before striking Vietnam killing at least 22 people. The Atlantic season continued with the formation of Hurricanes Maria, Nate, Ophelia, Philippe, and Rita, and a short lived depression. Maria, affected parts of Norway causing 3 deaths. Nate stayed at sea however it disturbed some Canadian Navy ships heading to the U.S to help in the aftermath of Hurricane Katrina along with Ophelia which affected much of the Eastern United States as well as parts of Atlantic Canada. Hurricane Rita on the other hand became the third Category 5 hurricane in the basin and became the most intense Atlantic Hurricane in the Gulf of Mexico by pressure. Rita then made landfall near the Texas-Louisiana border which was already devastated by Hurricane Katrina. Rita was the strongest storm in 2005 until it was then beaten by Hurricane Wilma the next month. In the North Indian Ocean, three short lived depressions as well as Cyclone Pyarr formed. Pyarr, being the only named stormed of the month affected India and Bangladesh which resulted in severe damage and severe loss of life.

October

October was above average featuring sixteen storms with eight of them being named. In the East Pacific a short lived depression formed. The storm officially ended the 2005 Pacific hurricane season. In the West Pacific, Typhoons Kirogi and Kai-tak along with three depressions formed. Kirogi approached Japan but drifted away from the mainland. Kai-tak on the other hand paralleled the Vietnamese coast as a tropical storm before dissipating. In the Atlantic, the active season continued on with the formation of Tropical Storms Tammy and Alpha and, Hurricanes Stan, Vince, Wilma, Beta and along with two depressions and an unnamed subtropical storm. Stan affected much of Central America and Mexico killing more than 1,600 people. Vince formed out of the unnamed subtropical storm which then intensified into a minimal Category 1 hurricane becoming the most eastern hurricane until the record was broken by Hurricane Pablo in 2019. Hurricane Wilma on the other hand intensified into a Category 5 hurricane within a day with its pressure dropping from 982hPa to 882hPa within a 30-hour period. Wilma became the most intense Atlantic hurricane ever recorded, based on pressure. In the North Indian Ocean, 03B and BOB 04 formed but were short lived.

November

November was average featuring ten storms with seven storms being named. In the Southern Hemisphere, 02R and 01F formed but were short lived. Another notable storm was Cyclone Bertie-Alvin which was given two names. Bertie-Alvin wandered across the Southern Indian Ocean before dissipating. In the West Pacific, Tembin and Bolaven formed with the storms affecting the Philippines. In the North Indian Ocean, BOB 05 and Cyclone Baaz. In the Atlantic, Tropical storms Gamma, Delta and Hurricane Epsilon formed. Gamma affected Central America while Epsilon stayed out to sea. Delta, on the other hand, stuck the Canary Islands which destroyed an iconic sea stack. Delta's remnants then made landfall of Morocco and Algeria.

December

December was inactive featuring six storms with two of them being named. In the Southern Hemisphere, 02F and 04R formed but were short lived. In the West Pacific, a short lived depression that was named Quedan by the PAGASA traveled across the South China Sea and dissipated south of Vietnam. In the North Indian Ocean, Cyclonic Storm Fanoos and BOB 08 formed with Fannos making landfall in Southern India. BOB 08 on the other hand stayed in the Bay of Bengal. In the Atlantic, Zeta formed very late in the season and became the 28th storm of the year. Zeta continued into January 2006 which made it the second Atlantic tropical cyclones to span two calendar years (the other being Hurricane Alice in 1954–55).

Global effects

See also

 Tropical cyclones by year
 List of earthquakes in 2005
 Tornadoes of 2005

Notes

1 Only systems that formed either on or after January 1, 2005 are counted in the seasonal totals.
2 Only systems that formed either before or on December 31, 2005 are counted in the seasonal totals.3 The wind speeds for this tropical cyclone/basin are based on the IMD Scale which uses 3-minute sustained winds.
4 The wind speeds for this tropical cyclone/basin are based on the Saffir Simpson Scale which uses 1-minute sustained winds.5The wind speeds for this tropical cyclone are based on Météo-France which uses gust winds.

References

External links 

Regional Specialized Meteorological Centers
 US National Hurricane Center – North Atlantic, Eastern Pacific
 Central Pacific Hurricane Center – Central Pacific
 Japan Meteorological Agency – NW Pacific
 India Meteorological Department – Bay of Bengal and the Arabian Sea
 Météo-France – La Reunion – South Indian Ocean from 30°E to 90°E
 Fiji Meteorological Service – South Pacific west of 160°E, north of 25° S

Tropical Cyclone Warning Centers
 Meteorology, Climatology, and Geophysical Agency of Indonesia – South Indian Ocean from 90°E to 141°E, generally north of 10°S
 Australian Bureau of Meteorology (TCWC's Perth, Darwin & Brisbane) – South Indian Ocean & South Pacific Ocean from 90°E to 160°E, generally south of 10°S
 Papua New Guinea National Weather Service – South Pacific Ocean from 141°E to 160°E, generally north of 10°S
 Meteorological Service of New Zealand Limited – South Pacific west of 160°E, south of 25°S

Tropical cyclones by year
2005 Atlantic hurricane season
2005 Pacific hurricane season
2005 Pacific typhoon season
2005 North Indian Ocean cyclone season
2004–05 Australian region cyclone season
2005–06 Australian region cyclone season
2004–05 South Pacific cyclone season
2005–06 South Pacific cyclone season
2004–05 South-West Indian Ocean cyclone season
2005–06 South-West Indian Ocean cyclone season
2005-related lists